Thunderbolt Jack is a 1920 American silent Western film serial directed by Francis Ford and Murdock MacQuarrie, produced by Berwilla Film Corp., and released on the states-rights market by Arrow Film Corp. The serial is considered to be lost.

Plot
As described in a film magazine, Jack's parents are tricked into a sale of their land through the conniving of Bull Flint (Frank), the big man of the small town near the home of the Hollidays. Oil has been discovered on the land and Flint plots to obtain it. Flint dishonestly acquires the deed to the land and strikes oil on the property. Bess Morgan (Sais) gives the Hollidays a home on her ranch. Jack Holliday (Jack Hoxie) comes home from college and rescues Bess from assault by Tom Flint, brother of Bull and a member of his gang. Fighting off repeated attempts by the gang to get him, Jack sees the two Flints imprisoned and the Holliday lands restored. Bess and Jack are rewarded with each other's love.

Cast
 Jack Hoxie as Jack Holliday
 Marin Sais as Bess Morgan
 Christian J. Frank as 'Bull' Flint (credited as Chris Frank)
 Al Hoxie as Bud (credited as Alton Hoxie)
 Steve Clemente as Manuel Garcia (credited as Steve Clemento)

See also
 List of film serials
 List of film serials by studio
 List of lost films

References

External links

 

1920 films
American silent serial films
1920 Western (genre) films
American black-and-white films
Lost Western (genre) films
Films directed by Francis Ford
Films directed by Murdock MacQuarrie
Lost American films
1920 lost films
Arrow Film Corporation films
Silent American Western (genre) films
1920s American films